Shirasagiyu Tawaraya is a traditional Japanese ryokan (inn) established in 1190, the oldest in Yamanaka Onsen town, part of Kaga city in Ishikawa Prefecture, Japan. The hotel is operated by the same family for over 800 years, now up to the 25th generation.

Yamanaka Onsen is a famous hot spring in the Kakusenkei valley surrounded by mountains, with a long history and a rich culture.

Water baths from the local natural spring were described in poems from the 17th century by famous Japanese poet Matsuo Bashō. The spring water contains calcium, sodium, sulfate and is reputed to help with arthritis, gastroenteric disorders, neuralgia, external injuries and other diseases.

See also 

Onsen
List of oldest companies

References

External links 
Company homepage
Hotel on Google Maps

Hotels in Ishikawa Prefecture
Bathing in Japan
1190s establishments in Japan
Companies based in Ishikawa Prefecture
Companies established in the 12th century
Kaga, Ishikawa